K-51 or K51 may refer to:

 K-51 (Kansas highway)
 , a survey ship of the South African Navy
 Junkers K 51, a German aircraft design study
 La finta semplice, by Wolfgang Amadeus Mozart
 Potassium-51, an isotope of potassium
 
 
 Toyota K51 transmission